William Vincent Tompkinson (18 June 1895 – 1968) was an English footballer who played in the Football League for Aberdare Athletic, Rochdale, Stockport County and Stoke.

Career
Tompkinson was born in Stone, Staffordshire and started his career at First Division side Wolverhampton Wanderers whilst he was a regular for their reserve side he never was able to break into the first team and left in 1915 to join Stoke. The "Potters" were playing in the Southern Football League Division Two at the time and were well on their way to claiming the title. Due to the goalscoring form of Arthur Watkin, and the two Smith's Alf and Dick, Tompkinson only managed one appearance during the 1914–15 season which came in a 4–2 win away at Welsh side Mid Rhondda in April 1915. Due to the outbreak of World War I, Stoke entered war league football and Tompkinson joined the British Army, he returned to the club in 1919. He was again unable to break into Stoke's first team and made just one more appearance in a 1–0 defeat away at Bury in February 1920.

He was released by Stoke at the end of the season and joined new Welsh side Aberdare Athletic in 1921. At Aberdare Tompkinson was able to play regular football and managed to make 41 appearances during the 1921–22 season. He joined Rochdale in 1923 and stayed at Dale for four years making 162 league appearances and scoring 45 goals. He finished his career at Stockport County and then at Connah's Quay & Shotton and finally Macclesfield.

Career statistics
Source:

References

1895 births
1968 deaths
People from Stone, Staffordshire
Footballers from Staffordshire
English footballers
Association football outside forwards
Wolverhampton Wanderers F.C. players
Stoke City F.C. players
Aberdare Athletic F.C. players
Rochdale A.F.C. players
Stockport County F.C. players
Connah's Quay F.C. players
Macclesfield Town F.C. players
English Football League players
British Army personnel of World War I